Dendrophagus cygnaei is a species in the family Silvanidae ("silvanid flat bark beetles"), in the order Coleoptera ("beetles").
Dendrophagus cygnaei is found in North America.

References

Further reading
 American Beetles, Volume II: Polyphaga: Scarabaeoidea through Curculionoidea, Arnett, R.H. Jr., M. C. Thomas, P. E. Skelley and J. H. Frank. (eds.). 2002. CRC Press LLC, Boca Raton, FL.
 American Insects: A Handbook of the Insects of America North of Mexico, Ross H. Arnett. 2000. CRC Press.
 Leng, Charles W. (1920). Catalogue of the Coleoptera of America, North of Mexico, x + 470.
 Peterson Field Guides: Beetles, Richard E. White. 1983. Houghton Mifflin Company.
 Thomas, Michael C. (1993). The Flat Bark Beetles of Florida (Coleoptera: Silvanidae, Passandridae, Laemophloeidae). Arthropods of Florida and Neighboring Land Areas, vol. 15, vii + 93.

External links

Silvanidae
Beetles described in 1846